Domenico Mazzocchi (baptised 1592 in Civita Castellana21 January 1665 in Veja) was an Italian Baroque composer of only vocal music, of the generation after Claudio Monteverdi.

He was a learned Roman lawyer, studied music with Giovanni Maria Nanino (or Nanini), also in Rome, and entered the service of cardinal Ippolito Aldobrandini in 1621.

He is associated with providing music for the popes, particularly Cardinal Maffeo Barberini, later Pope Urban VIII, until Mazzocchi's death in Rome on 21 January 1665.

His younger brother, Virgilio Mazzocchi, was a less notable Roman composer and had a similar career as a Vatican music provider.

Works

Operas
La catena d'Adone (1626)
L'innocenza difesa

Other

 Madrigali a 5 voci in partitura (1638), madrigals which have Basso continuo, similar to the late Monteverdi; these contain the first notations, as explained in the preface, of the persisting conventional musical symbols < 'crescendo', > 'decrescendo', p(iano), f(orte) and tr(illo)
 Oratorio
David
Maddalena 
 church music, notably motets

Notes

References
 Entry under Domenico Mazzocchi in the Grove Dictionary of Music and Musicians.
 Entry under Mazzocchi, Domenico  & Virgilio, in the Concise Baker's Biographical Dictionary of Composers.
 Cardinali A., 1926, Cenni biografici di Domenico e Virgilio Mazzocchi.

External links
 

1592 births
1665 deaths
Italian Baroque composers
Italian male classical composers
17th-century Italian composers
17th-century male musicians